Recreational Road 3 (RE 3) is a Recreational Road located in Fannin County in North Texas. The road travels in a generally west-east alignment through mixed rural-residential land along the southern shore of Lake Bonham. Its eastern terminus is at County Road 2619 (CR 2610) on the eastern border of the recreation area. The highway was designated in 1970 when the City of Bonham requested the Texas State Highway Commission build a highway to connect its newly-created City Lake park to the state highway network. The road was constructed in 1972 after two years of delays over right-of-way issues largely over the route of an existing dirt track.

Route description

Along its entire length, the highway runs as a two-lane, undivided roadway. For its first , the route travels in a northeastern direction. The roadway makes two wide bends through largely agricultural land along this stretch. After intersecting Circle Drive, approximately  into its course, the highway travels into more residential and densely forested areas along the southern shore of Lake Bonham. Near its midpoint, the road intersects County Road 2607 (CR 2607), a residential street which travels southward. Continuing eastward, the highway passes two additional residential streets to its north and a large self storage facility to its south. After a T-intersection with CR 2608 to the south, the roadway passes Bonham City Lake Recreation Area (Lake Bonham Park) to its north. The park provides publicly accessible recreational facilities on Lake Bonham, including a boat ramp, restrooms, and camping sites.

History

The city of Bonham started planning Lake Bonham in 1960 as a supply source for its municipal water system. Construction of the Timber Creek Dam, which impounds the reservoir, began in 1966. In September 1969, as the reservoir was nearing completion, the Bonham Water Authority elected to develop a park which would become the Bonham City Lake Recreation Area. As part of the resolution, the organization sent a request to the Texas Highway Department for a paved road to the site.

At its April 1970 meeting, the Highway Commission, in response to increasing requests for the construction of park access roads, created the Recreational Road program and set aside $25 million (equivalent to $ in ) in funds for new construction under the system. Two highways, RE 255 and RE 2, were added to the system at the time. At its following meeting in May, the Highway Commission approved the Bonham Water Authority's request and designated the Lake Bonham park road as the third route in the Recreational Road system. The Highway Department estimated that construction of the roadway would cost approximately $111,000 (equivalent to $ in ).

The Commission's initial proposal called for a  highway to be built along the course of an existing county road. This route had existed since at least 1940, when it was an unimproved dirt farm road; by 1959, it had been upgraded to a graded, light-duty dirt road. The proposed improvements included upgrading the surface to all-weather asphalt pavement and smoothing out three sharp curves along the existing route. A public hearing on the proposal was held on December 30, 1970. Ahead of this hearing, on December 14, the Bonham city council voted to endorse the Highway Commission's proposed route, though the vote was largely symbolic as the city held no control over routing or right-of-way of the highway. At the hearing, the state's proposal was supported by local officials including the county Commissioners' Court, Bonham Water Authority, and Bonham Chamber of Commerce. Local residents, by contrast, raised objections over the routing of the highway, in particular the curve adjustments. One landowner along the proposed route was recorded saying he "was for the road, but not where you are putting it".

Acquiring right-of-way for the roadway proceeded slowly. Much of the land required for RE 3 was already owned by either Fannin County or the Bonham Water Authority, but about  along the proposed route belonged to private landowners. While a contemporary news article speculated that construction on the route might begin before the end of 1971, by November of that year, only two-thirds of the required land deeds had been acquired by the county. The final right-of-way was not received until January 1972.

An initial invitation for bids to construct the roadway in February 1972 was unsuccessful, after which a second round of bidding was opened at the June meeting of the State Highway Commission. The R.W. McKinney Company of Nacogdoches, Texas, was awarded the construction contract with a bid of $109,428.45. Construction on the highway began in late July. Highway Department officials projected that the route would be completed by October 15. Weather delays, however, prevented the paving of the last portions of the route in time for an official opening ceremony for the lake and park on October 27.

Major intersections

References

External links

0003
Transportation in Fannin County, Texas